Paul Theodore Heyne (November 2, 1931 – April 9, 2000) was an American economist and academic who lectured on economics at the University of Washington in Seattle.

Heyne received two divinity degrees from Concordia Seminary in St. Louis, took his master's degree at Washington University and his Ph.D. in ethics and society at the University of Chicago. He came to the UW in 1976 and reportedly turned down a tenured position to become a senior lecturer because of his interest in teaching undergraduates.

Heyne promoted economics through his interests with religion, social issues, justice and free market economies. His best-known work was his critically acclaimed introductory textbook The Economic Way of Thinking, which sold 200,000 copies in Russia alone and has been translated in Bulgarian, Czech, Hungarian, Romanian and other languages. Heyne was largely committed to undergraduate education.

Heyne, a native of St. Louis, Missouri, died in Seattle, aged 68.

Selected bibliography

 1976. Paul T. Heyne, Thomas Johnson. Toward Economic Understanding. . Science Research Associates.
2000. Paul Heyne  A Student's Guide to Economics: Volume 3 of ISI Guides to the Major Disciplines. . Intercollegiate Studies Institute.
2008. Paul T. Heyne, Geoffrey Brennan, A. M. C. Waterman. "Are Economists Basically Immoral?": And Other Essays on Economics, Ethics, and Religion. . Liberty Fund.
2013. Paul L. Heyne, Peter J. Boettke, David L. Prychitko.The Economic Way of Thinking: Pearson New International Edition. . Pearson Education.

References

External links
 Audio of final public lecture: "The Moral Critics of Capitalism"
 "In Memoriam: Paul Heyne, 1931–2000": 

1931 births
2000 deaths
20th-century American economists
Washington University in St. Louis alumni
University of Chicago alumni
University of Washington faculty
People from St. Louis
Economists from Missouri
Concordia Seminary alumni